Brandon Biro (born March 11, 1998) is a Canadian professional ice hockey winger currently playing for the Rochester Americans in the American Hockey League (AHL) as a prospect to the Buffalo Sabres of the National Hockey League (NHL). He played collegiately at Penn State.

Career

Junior
Biro played two seasons with the Spruce Grove Saints of the Alberta Junior Hockey League, winning the league's Rookie of the Year award in the 201415 season.

College
Biro played four seasons for the Penn State Nittany Lions. At the end of his collegiate career, he was eighth all-time for Penn State in goals (41), third all-time in assists (75), and fourth all-time in points (116).

Professional
On March 18, 2020, Biro was signed by the Buffalo Sabres of the National Hockey League as an undrafted free agent. He made his professional debut with Buffalo's AHL affiliate, the Rochester Americans, on February 12, 2021.

Biro made his NHL debut for the Sabres on February 23, 2022, in a game against the Montreal Canadiens.

Personal life
Biro's younger brother, Jordan, plays collegiately for Colorado College.

His father, Rob, played collegiate soccer at the University of Alberta. He also played one season with the Winnipeg Fury of the Canadian Soccer League. He now works for Edmonton Catholic Schools as a soccer director.

Career statistics

Awards and honours

References

External links

1998 births
Canadian ice hockey left wingers
Buffalo Sabres players
Ice hockey people from Alberta
Living people
Penn State Nittany Lions men's ice hockey players
People from Sherwood Park
Rochester Americans players
Spruce Grove Saints players
Undrafted National Hockey League players